Kyaw Kyaw (born 8 July 1950) is a Burmese politician who currently serves as an Amyotha Hluttaw MP for Rakhine State No. 4 Constituency. He is a member of Rakhine National Party.

In the 2010 Myanmar general election, he was elected as an Amyotha Hluttaw MP and elected representative from Rakhine State № 2 parliamentary constituency.

Early life and education
He was born on 7 July 1950 in Mrauk U, Rakhine State , Burma(Myanmar). He graduated with B.A(L.L.B) from Yangon University. His previous job is a lawyer.

Political career
He is a member of the Rakhine National Party. In the Myanmar general election, 2015, he was elected as an Amyotha Hluttaw MP and elected representative from Rakhine State № 4 parliamentary constituency .

References

Arakan National Party politicians
1950 births
Living people
People from Rakhine State
University of Yangon alumni
20th-century Burmese lawyers
Arakanese politicians